Alexander Viveros Sánchez (born 8 October 1977) is a Colombian retired footballer who played as a left back.

Other than in his own, he played in five countries in a 14-year professional career. Viveros represented Colombia at the 1999 Copa América.

Club career
Born in Cali, Viveros started playing professionally in 1996 with hometown's Deportivo Cali, appearing in 21 games in his second year as the club won the national championship. In 2000, he moved to Brazil and signed for Cruzeiro Esporte Clube, joining Fluminense FC in the following year but leaving the Rio de Janeiro side shortly after.

Viveros spent the 2001–02 campaign in Argentina with Racing Club de Avellaneda, appearing regularly as they won the Apertura tournament. In January 2003, after a second spell with Cruzeiro, he moved to Portugal with Boavista F.C., playing 24 Primeira Liga matches in his only full season, with the Porto team ranking in eighth place.

Viveros met different fates with his next two clubs, starting with FC Nantes in France – albeit only in his first year in Ligue 1, with Nantes finishing in 17th, the first position above the relegation zone – but being a reserve with Swiss Super League side Grasshopper Club Zürich, for which he signed in January 2006. He then returned to his country and Deportivo Cali for a further two seasons.

In 2007–08, Viveros competed in Argentina with Talleres de Córdoba, in Primera B Nacional. After one year out of football, he closed out his career at nearly 33 with Boyacá Chicó FC.

International career
Viveros gained 34 caps for Colombia during six years (two goals), being selected for the squad that appeared at the 1999 Copa América in Paraguay, and being a starter in an eventual quarter-final exit.

Honours
Categoría Primera A: 1998
Copa do Brasil: 2000
Argentine Primera División: 2001 Apertura

References

External links

1977 births
Living people
Footballers from Cali
Colombian footballers
Association football defenders
Categoría Primera A players
Deportivo Cali footballers
Boyacá Chicó F.C. footballers
Campeonato Brasileiro Série A players
Cruzeiro Esporte Clube players
Fluminense FC players
Argentine Primera División players
Racing Club de Avellaneda footballers
Talleres de Córdoba footballers
Primeira Liga players
Boavista F.C. players
Ligue 1 players
FC Nantes players
Swiss Super League players
Grasshopper Club Zürich players
Colombia international footballers
Colombian expatriate footballers
Expatriate footballers in Brazil
Expatriate footballers in Argentina
Expatriate footballers in Portugal
Expatriate footballers in France
Expatriate footballers in Switzerland
Colombian expatriate sportspeople in Brazil
Colombian expatriate sportspeople in Argentina
Colombian expatriate sportspeople in Portugal
Colombian expatriate sportspeople in Switzerland